Nagesvarar Temple is a Siva temple in Valarpuram in Vellore district in Tamil Nadu (India).

Vaippu Sthalam
It is one of the shrines of the Vaippu Sthalams sung by Tamil Saivite Nayanar Appar.

Presiding deity
The presiding deity is known as Nagesvarar. The Goddess is known as Sornavalli.

Speciality
From the inscriptions found in this temple that a Pandya king known has donated for this temple. The name of this temple is mentioned as Valaikulattu Nagesvaramudayar in the inscriptions.

References

Hindu temples in Vellore district
Shiva temples in Vellore district